Corduba (minor planet designation: 365 Corduba) is a very large main-belt asteroid that was discovered by the French astronomer Auguste Charlois on 21 March 1893 from Nice. It is classified as a C-type asteroid and is probably composed of carbonaceous material.

Photometric observations of this asteroid at the Palmer Divide Observatory in Colorado Springs, Colorado, during 2007 gave a light curve with a period of 6.551 ± 0.002 hours and a brightness variation of 0.05 in magnitude. This differs somewhat from a 2004 study that gave a period of 6.354 hours, but this difference may be explained by the small magnitude variation which tends to increase the randomizing effect of noise in the data.

References

External links 
 Lightcurve plot of 365 Corduba, Palmer Divide Observatory, B. D. Warner (2007)
 Asteroid Lightcurve Database (LCDB), query form (info )
 Dictionary of Minor Planet Names, Google books
 Asteroids and comets rotation curves, CdR – Observatoire de Genève, Raoul Behrend
 Discovery Circumstances: Numbered Minor Planets (1)-(5000) – Minor Planet Center
 
 

Background asteroids
Corduba
Corduba
X-type asteroids (Tholen)
C-type asteroids (SMASS)
18930321